Amphisbaena cunhai is a species of amphisbaenian in the family Amphisbaenidae. The species is endemic to Brazil.

Etymology
The specific name, cunhai, is in honor of Brazilian herpetologist Osvaldo Rodrigues da Cunha.

Geographic range
A. cunhai is found in the Brazilian states of Amazonas and Rondônia.

Habitat
The preferred natural habitat of A. cunhai is forest, but it is also found in cultivated areas that were previously forest.

Behavior
A. cunhai is terrestrial and fossorial.

Reproduction
A. cunhai is oviparous.

References

Further reading
Gans C (2005). "Checklist and Bibliography of the Amphisbaenia of the World". Bulletin of the American Museum of Natural History (289): 1–130. (Amphisbaena cunhai, p. 113).
Hoogmoed MS, Ávila-Pires TCS (1991). "A new species of smal Amphisbaena (Reptilia: Amphisbaenia: Amphisbaenidae) from western Amazonian Brazil". Boletim do Museu Paraense Emilio Goeldi Serie Zoologia 7 (1): 77–94. (Amphisbaena cunhai, new species).
Vanzolini PE (2002). "An aid to the identification of the South American species of Amphisbaena (Squamata, Amphisbaenidae)". Papéis Avulsos de Zoologia, Museu de Zoologia da Universidade de São Paulo 42 (15): 351–362.

cunhai
Reptiles described in 1991
Taxa named by Marinus Steven Hoogmoed
Taxa named by Teresa C.S. Ávila-Pires
Endemic fauna of Brazil
Reptiles of Brazil